Felipe del Mestre (born 25 September 1993) is an Argentine rugby union player. He has medaled at the 2019 Pan American Games. He was also selected to Argentina squad to compete at the 2020 Summer Olympics in the men's rugby sevens tournament.

References 

1993 births
Living people
Argentine rugby sevens players
Argentina international rugby sevens players
Male rugby sevens players
Olympic rugby sevens players of Argentina
Rugby sevens players at the 2020 Summer Olympics
Pan American Games medalists in rugby sevens
Pan American Games gold medalists for Argentina
Olympic medalists in rugby sevens
Medalists at the 2020 Summer Olympics
Olympic bronze medalists for Argentina
Medalists at the 2019 Pan American Games